Nelyubino is a rural locality (a village) in Pyatovskoye Rural Settlement, Totemsky District, Vologda Oblast, Russia. The population was 33 as of 2002.

Geography 
Nelyubino is located 6 km northwest of Totma (the district's administrative centre) by road. Lesnikovo is the nearest rural locality.

References 

Rural localities in Tarnogsky District